The Kuma is a river on the Black Sea-Caspian Steppe of southern Russia. It flows northeast into the Caspian Sea. Its source is in the Greater Caucasus, in the republic Karachay-Cherkessia, west of Kislovodsk. It flows in northeastern direction, through Stavropol Krai (towns Mineralnye Vody, Zelenokumsk, Budyonnovsk, Neftekumsk) and further east through the Caspian Depression as the natural border between Kalmykia and Dagestan. That part of the Kuma's valley forms the eastern part of the Kuma–Manych Depression, separating the East European Plain from the Caucasus region. The Kuma flows into the Kizlyar Gulf of the Caspian Sea near the border between Dagestan and Kalmykia.

Most of the rivers that flow north from the Caucasus Mountains and into Terek–Kuma Lowland are caught by the Kuban and Terek. It rises between the basins of those two rivers so the Kuma is mainly a steppe river.  It is much used for irrigation.

Construction projects  

If the plans for the proposed Eurasia Canal, linking the Caspian Sea with the Black Sea, are ever implemented, it will likely follow the Kuma River valley in its eastern section.

References

Rivers of Dagestan
Rivers of Kalmykia
Rivers of Karachay-Cherkessia
Rivers of Stavropol Krai
Tributaries of the Caspian Sea
Caspian Depression